Estavayer is a municipality of the canton of Fribourg, situated on the south shore of Lake Neuchâtel. Estavayer is located between Yverdon and Bern. It is the capital of the district of Broye.  It was created on 1 January 2017 when the former municipalities of Bussy, Estavayer-le-Lac, Morens, Murist, Rueyres-les-Prés, Vernay and Vuissens merged to form Estavayer.

History

Bussy
Bussy is first mentioned in 1142 as Bussey.

Morens
Morens is first mentioned in 1216 as Morens.

Murist
Murist is first mentioned in 1228 as Muris.

Rueyres-les-Prés
Rueyres-les-Prés is first mentioned in 1288 as en Ruere.

Vernay
Vernay was created on 1 January 2006 from the merger of the municipalities of Autavaux, Forel and Montbrelloz.

Geography

Population

Historic Population
The historical population is given in the following chart:

Heritage sites of national significance
The De Rivaz Chapel, the Sacré-Coeur Chapel, the Chenaux Castle, the Collegiate church of Saint-Laurent, the Convent of the Dominican nuns, the town fortifications, the House de la Dîme and the House des Sires d’Estavayer in Estavayer-le-Lac, the Church of Saint-Maurice in Bussy, the Saint-Pierre Church and the La Molière tower in Murist listed as Swiss heritage site of national significance.  The entire town of Estavayer-le-Lac and the villages of Bussy and Vuissens are part of the Inventory of Swiss Heritage Sites.  From the 2012 merger of Font into Estavayer-le-Lac, the Gallo-Roman villa at La Vuardaz and the entire Font area (shared between Châbles and Font) were added.

Transportation
The municipality has a railway station, on the Fribourg–Yverdon line.

References

External links

Cities in Switzerland
Former municipalities of the canton of Fribourg
Cultural property of national significance in the canton of Fribourg
Populated places on Lake Neuchâtel